Nofi may refer to:

Albert Nofi (born 1944), American historian and game designer
No-Fi, music or media created outside conventional technical standard